The National Jazz and Blues Festival was the precursor to the Reading Rock Festival and was the brainchild of Harold Pendleton, the founder of the prestigious Marquee Club in Soho.

History

Initially called The National Jazz Festival, it was a showcase for British and US jazz and was held at Richmond Athletic Ground in the sedate London suburb of Richmond.  The first festival took place on 26-27 August 1961, and the headline acts included Johnny Dankworth and Chris Barber.  Inspiration for the event came from the Newport Jazz Festival, held in the US since 1954.

In 1964 the festival changed its name to "The National Jazz and Blues Festival", which reflected the change in musical tastes occurring in Britain in the early 1960s. Gradually the jazz component of the festival was whittled away and by 1967, the festival was featuring the likes of Cream, Fleetwood Mac and Jeff Beck, whilst the jazz groups were relegated to an afternoon session.

One of the features of the festival during the 1960s was its constant search for a permanent home: festival noise and crowds alienated locals and the festival moved from Richmond to Windsor in Berkshire (1966–67), to Sunbury in Surrey (1968) and then to Plumpton (1969–70). By this time the jazz content was almost non-existent and the festival was featuring a mix of progressive rock, folk and blues and drawing crowds of around 30,000.

Move to Reading
In 1971, the festival finally found a permanent home when Pendleton moved base to Reading. This move also signified the beginning of the end of the more eclectic mix of music that had been the hallmark of the festival. By 1971 the festival had become "The National Jazz, Blues and Rock Festival" and had begun to mutate into a hard rock festival. Although George Melly and John McLaughlin did participate in these years, it was bands such as Hawkwind, Thin Lizzy and Rory Gallagher who drew the crowds.

By 1975, the festival attendance had swollen to 70,000 and there were nasty scenes where can fights became the norm and some reggae artists were received with hostility. In 1976 the festival changed its name to "Reading Rock" and the transformation was complete. Hard rock and heavy metal were the staple of the festival until well into the 1980s.

See also

List of historic rock festivals
List of blues festivals
List of jazz festivals 
 Reading and Leeds Festivals

References

External links
The Archive: a history of UK rock festivals
National Jazz and Blues Festival and The Marquee Club

 

Music festivals in England
Jazz festivals in the United Kingdom
Rock festivals in England
Blues festivals in the United Kingdom
Folk festivals in the United Kingdom
Festivals in Berkshire
Music festivals established in 1961
Music festivals in London